The Thetford Center Covered Bridge is a historic covered bridge, carrying Tucker Hill Road across the Ompompanoosuc River in Thetford, Vermont.  It is the state's only known example of the Haupt patent truss system.  It was listed on the National Register of Historic Places in 1974.

Description and history
The Thetford Center Covered Bridge is located a short way west of the village of Thetford Center, spanning the south-flowing Ompompanoosuc River, a tributary of the Connecticut River. The bridge is covered by a metal roof and sheathed in vertical board siding. The deck is now supported by steel I-beams, and the original bridge trusses support only the bridge superstructure. The bridge trusses are a variant of a multiple kingpost truss. Each truss has verticals and diagonals in that style, but is further augmented by a laminated arch, consisting of heavy planks pegged together.

The bridge's construction date is unknown.  It is the only example of the Haupt patent truss known in the state, and may be the only example in the northeastern United States.  The alterations made to support the deck with I-beams, including capping the abutments and adding the central pier, were made in 1963.

See also
 
 
 
 National Register of Historic Places listings in Orange County, Vermont
 List of Vermont covered bridges
 List of bridges on the National Register of Historic Places in Vermont

References

Covered bridges on the National Register of Historic Places in Vermont
National Register of Historic Places in Orange County, Vermont
Covered bridges in Orange County, Vermont
Buildings and structures in Thetford, Vermont
Road bridges on the National Register of Historic Places in Vermont
Wooden bridges in Vermont
King post truss bridges in the United States
Historic district contributing properties in Vermont